The men's shot put event at the 1951 Pan American Games was held at the Estadio Monumental in Buenos Aires on 2 March.

Results

References

Athletics at the 1951 Pan American Games
1951